Reassemblage is a 1982 film by Trinh T. Minh-ha, shot in Senegal picturing the dwellings and everyday life of the Sereer people. The first film by the Vietnamese born filmmaker, writer, literary theorist, composer, and professor, Reassemblage focuses especially on the lives of the village women. Shot on 16mm film and released in 1982, the film challenges ethnographic documentary conventions (eg. National Geographic) and explores experimental ways of representing native culture.
Minh-ha explains that she intends "not to speak about/Just speak nearby," unlike more conventional ethnographic documentary film. The film is a montage of fleeting images, sounds, and music from Senegal and includes no narration, although there are occasional statements by Trinh T. Minh-ha. None of the statements given by her assign meaning to the scenes, refusing to make the film "about" a "culture". It points to the viewers expectation and the need for the assignment of meaning.

Plot
Reassemblage does not follow a conventional plot, but rather presents sounds and visuals through non-linear montage. The film consists of a various shots capturing different landscapes, activities, animals, conversations, and people. The accompanying sounds include indigenous music, diegetic sounds and conversations, and a voiceover from Minh-ha. The voiceover does not provide narration or explanation of the scenes, but rather critical reflections on the filmmaking process and ethnographic documentary.

Themes

 Womanhood and fire: The concept of 'women possessing the fire' is repeated throughout the film. This reflects Senegalese culture where the women are generally in charge of the household chores, most importantly being fire. Shots of burning bushland are also recurring throughout the film, accompanied by a distinct focus on the village women as subject.
Reflexivity: Minh-ha's voiceover is reflexive towards both ethnographic film and film processes, and the filmmaker's own position. In her scholarly work, Minh-ha claims that there is "no such thing as documentary." She challenges the authority and factuality and documentary and ethnographic film by encouraging a critical eye when viewing and interpreting colonial and cultural audio-visuals. Here, Minh-ha prioritises "speaking nearby" rather than "speaking about" or "speaking for" others. Reassemblage presents cultural images but does not assign meaning for interpretation, thus letting the images speak for themselves. This encourages audiences to recognise the ambiguity of the constructed images they are being presented with. Minh-ha's voiceover also explicitly confronts viewers with conventions and expectations related to ethnographic film. At one point, the voiceover discusses audience expectations of films on Africa, such as “naked-breasted women, exotic dances, and fearful rites”. However, while bringing critical awareness to this trope through sound, the visuals simultaneously serve these expectations by displaying a close up of bare-breasted women. The film thus plays with ethnographic film conventions through the interplay of sound and vision in order to encourage a self-reflective perspective shared by audience and filmmaker. Here, the film draws attention both to Senegal, and on how we look at Senegal. Without giving clear answers or solutions for the post-colonial problems of ethnographic film, Minh-ha's representations evoke questions.
 Post-colonialism: The film's attitude towards filmmaking, colonised culture, and representation can be considered to relate to post-colonial perspectives. The critical approach to portraying culture through film subverts the colonial power of capturing and displaying culture in favour of complexity, ambiguity, and non-resolution. The film compliments Minh-ha's academic contributions to post-colonial discourse and theory.

Further reading 

 http://www.situatedecologies.net/wp-content/uploads/Trinh-Speaking-Nearby-1983.pdf
 Guèye, Khadidiatou. "Ethnocultural Voices and African Aesthetics in Trinh Minh-ha's "Reassemblage: From the Firelight to the Screen"." Research in African Literatures 39, no. 3 (2008): 14-25. Accessed May 21, 2021. http://www.jstor.org/stable/20109620.
 "Trinh T. Minh-ha". trinhminh-ha.com. Retrieved May 21, 2021.

References

External links
Reassemblage at IMDb

1983 films
Documentary films about the Serer people
Senegalese documentary films
1980s English-language films
American documentary films